Medjana District is a district of Bordj Bou Arréridj Province, Algeria.

Municipalities
The district is further divided into 4 municipalities:
Medjana
El Achir 
Hasnaoua
Teniet En-Nasr

Districts of Bordj Bou Arréridj Province